Alfonso Primitivo Ríos Vázquez (born 10 June 1955) is a Mexican politician from the Labor Party. He has served as Deputy of the LVI and LXI Legislatures of the Mexican Congress representing Durango. He also served in the LVIII and LXI Legislatures of the Congress of Durango.

References

1955 births
Living people
Politicians from Durango
Members of the Congress of Durango
Labor Party (Mexico) politicians
20th-century Mexican politicians
21st-century Mexican politicians
Deputies of the LXI Legislature of Mexico
Members of the Chamber of Deputies (Mexico) for Durango